Urani is a small town in Sri Lanka batticalo It is located within eastern provence.

See also
List of towns in Northern Province, Sri Lanka

External links

Populated places in Northern Province, Sri Lanka